Anolis websteri, the yellow-bellied desert anole or Webster's anole, is a species of lizard in the family Dactyloidae. The species is found in Haiti.

References

Anoles
Reptiles described in 1980
Endemic fauna of Haiti
Reptiles of Haiti
Taxa named by Edwin Nicholas Arnold